Charles Henry Danger Burgmann Firth is an Australian comedian, best known as a member of The Chaser productions CNNNN and The Chaser's War on Everything.

Biography

Early years
He is the brother of Verity Firth, who was a Minister for the Labor Government of New South Wales. Firth attended Sydney Grammar School, where along with Chaser colleagues Dominic Knight and Chas Licciardello he ran the satirical school magazine The Tiger.

Later years
Firth went on to attend the University of Sydney where he completed an Arts degree in political science, edited the Honi Soit student newspaper, and in 1997 broke through a plate glass window during a University Senate meeting to protest the introduction of full fee paying places at the university. While attending, Charles was also the subject of a reality-TV style documentary called Uni, by film-maker Simon Target, centred on the lives of students at the University of Sydney. Fellow Chaser Andrew Hansen was also a subject. It was aired on the ABC in 1996.

Charles' first arrest was notably during the filming of the first film in The Matrix franchise, after he was caught naked, jumping on Keanu Reeves' motorcycle. Reeves was later quoted saying "It was the craziest proclamation of love I've ever received."

On CNNNN, broadcast in 2003 and 2004, he played a role as host of the fictional segment "The Firth Factor", parodying journalistic styles used by the American Fox News commentator Bill O'Reilly's prime time show The O'Reilly Factor.

By 2006, Firth had moved to the United States. He periodically appeared on The Chaser's War on Everything in a segment about American culture entitled "Firth in the USA". This segment served to highlight American ignorance of Australia and the world in general.

During this time Firth also researched and wrote his first book, American Hoax. This involved creating a number of fictional stereotypical American characters on both the progressive-left and conservative-right sides of American politics. The characters included liberal ad-man Bertrand Newton, conservative scholar Dr Andrew O'Keefe, conservative economist Edward McGuire, working class bartender Darryl Summers, and female Iraqi-immigrant poet Khorin al-Ghrant. The book explored the efforts of these characters (all played by Firth) to try to interact with real-world political groups and individuals. American Hoax was released in November 2006.

Firth went to Adelaide in July 2007 to present at the Festival of Ideas with fellow Chaser Julian Morrow, where his performance included asking the audience to SMS their questions to him, throwing lollies to the audience, and "defacing" three Wikipedia articles.

Firth worked on a new weekly print magazine and news website, which was launched in mid-August 2007 called The Manic Times. The newspaper has since ceased production and that company is now called "Manic Studios" producing web video for the Australian, and more recently, American Union movements in partnership with The Republic. Firth remains actively involved as a writer, performer and producer.

Firth is now executive producer on a daily news satire program on ABC2 called The Roast

He generated controversy among the Westboro Baptist Church when he began to openly "flirt" with Fred Phelps's son while interviewing him for The Chaser's War on Everything at a Westboro picket. When Phelps junior began to walk away, Firth followed him and continued to openly "flirt" with him, persisting despite being called a "fag-ass pervert" by the rest of the picketers.

Firth is married to Amanda Tattersall, Founding Director of the Sydney Alliance and co-founder of getup.org.au, a community organiser and author of Power in Coalition a book on building coalitions between unions and community organisations They have two sons, Hartley and Angus.

Charles is known to have played in an amateur cricket team, "The Mighty Dicks", with Chris Taylor and Julian Morrow.

Other work and guest appearances
 In 2008, Firth created a one-hour television special for SBS on the then up-and-coming US election, titled 'Mr. Firth Goes To Washington'. It aired on Tuesday, 4 November at 8:30pm. A blog was also posted for this Mockumentary at the SBS website.
 Firth, along with fellow Chaser comedians, appears regularly on ABC Local Radio.
 Firth co-hosted Episode 50 – "The Chaser Special" – of the Macquarie Radio Network's podcast "Radio Ha Ha" on 10 November 2006.
 Outtakes from this episode were run in Episode 51 – "The Belated 50th Episode Special" the following week, on 17 November 2006
 In 2020, Firth began working with fellow Chaser's Dominic Knight and Andrew Hansen on a new podcast project, "The Chaser Report". Initially started as a satire of the weekly COVID news cycle.

References

External links
 Charles Firth at The Yellow Agency
 

The Chaser members
Australian television writers
Living people
People educated at Sydney Grammar School
Australian male comedians
Comedians from Sydney
Australian male television writers
1975 births